The 192nd Infantry Division, or the 192e division d'infanterie, was a French infantry division during World War II. The 192nd Infantry Division originally operated in the French Levant.


Overview
The 192nd Infantry Division established on July 19, 1939, as the 2nd Mixed Brigade of the Levant, however it was shortly thereafter on September 10, 1939, expanded and renamed the 2nd Infantry Division of the Levant. On October 5, 1939, the 2nd Infantry Division of the Levant was renamed once more to 192nd Infantry Division.

Organization
The 192nd Infantry Division was originally composed of the following:
Reconnaissance Group of the 192nd Infantry Division
6th Foreign Infantry Regiment
10th North African Demi-Brigade
17th Senegalese Regiment of Tirailleurs
One battery of the 41st Colonial Infantry Regiment
Two batteries of the 80th Field Artillery Regiment, North African

References

French World War II divisions
Infantry Division, 192nd